Susan Redhead (born 15 June 1962) is a Grenadian former cricketer who played as a right-handed batter. She appeared in 3 One Day Internationals for the West Indies in 2003. She played domestic cricket for Grenada.

References

External links 

1962 births
Living people
West Indian women cricketers
West Indies women One Day International cricketers
Grenadian women cricketers